Max Martersteig (11 February 1853 – 3 November 1926) was a German actor, theatre director and writer.

Life 
Born in Weimar, Martersteig began his acting training with Otto Devrient. He made his stage debut in 1873 as Charles VII in The Maid of Orleans. This was followed by engagements in Rostock, Frankfurt an der Oder (1875-1876), Weimar (1876–1879), Mainz (1879-1880), Aachen (1880-1881) and Kassel (1882-1885). In 1885, he became head director and artistic director of the theatre in Mannheim. In 1890, he left Mannheim and went to Riga where he was theatre director until 1896. In 1905, he was director of the theatre in Cologne and then in Leipzig until 1918.

He was also active as a playwright and theatre historian. In 1904, his work The German Theatre in the 19th Century was published, which is considered fundamental.

Martersteig was married to the actress Gertrud Eysoldt, and their son was the conductor and composer Leo Eysoldt.

Martersteig died in Cologne at the age of 73. His gravesite is in Cologne's Melaten Cemetery. The barely legible gravestone features a depiction of a Death Genius and bears a dedicatory inscription.

In 1968, Martersteigstraße was named after him in Köln-Seeberg.

Works 
 Im Pavillon 1878
 Jelta u. Ruben 1881
 Aus Hessens Vorzeit 1884
 Der Schauspieler, ein künstlerisches Problem 1893 (new edition 1900)
 Giovanni Segantini. Bard, Marquardt & Co., Berlin 1903
 Das deutsche Theater im neunzehnten Jahrhundert. Eine kulturgeschichtliche Darstellung 1904, 2nd edition 1924
 Das Abendbuch 1927
 Werner von Kuonefalk, A.G. Liebeskind publisher, Leipzig, 1886

References

Further reading 
 Ludwig Eisenberg: Großes biographisches Lexikon der Deutschen Bühne im XIX. Jahrhundert. Pail List editor, Leipzig 1903,.
 
 Gertrud Eysoldt: Das schöne Muster unseres Erlebnisses. Briefe an Max Martersteig. Berlin 2002
 Wolfgang Greiner: Max Martersteig, der Bühnenleiter und Schriftsteller. Emsdetten 1938

External links 
 
 Max-Martersteig-Archiv in archives of the Academy of Arts, Berlin

German male stage actors
German theatre directors
1853 births
1926 deaths
Writers from Weimar